Lotfi Laggoun (born April 17, 1984 in Alger, Algeria) is an Algerian football player who is currently playing as a defender for JSM Béjaïa in the Algerian Championnat National.

Club career
 2001-2007 CA Bordj Bou Arreridj 
 2007-pres. JSM Béjaïa

See also
Football in Algeria
List of football clubs in Algeria

References

1984 births
Algerian footballers
Living people
CA Bordj Bou Arréridj players
Footballers from Algiers
JSM Béjaïa players
Association football defenders
21st-century Algerian people